The Centre Party is a Christian democratic, conservative political party on the Faroe Islands, led by Jenis av Rana. The party is known for its social conservatism, particularly its stance on LGBT rights.

At the 2008 Faroese general election, the party won 8.4% of the popular vote and 3 out of 33 seats. In the 2011 Faroese general election, the party fell to 6.2% and two seats.

Current members of the Løgting 

As of the 2022 general snap election:

Leaders

History of Centre Party in the Faroese and Danish general elections

References

External links 

 Official web site

Christian democratic parties in Europe
Political parties in the Faroe Islands
Protestant political parties
Conservative parties in Denmark
Organizations that oppose LGBT rights
Centrist parties in Denmark